Iliyan Nedelchev (born 1 March 1996) is a Bulgarian footballer who plays as a midfielder for Ustrem Donchevo.

Career
Nedelchev started his professional career at Spartak Varna, playing for half a season in B Group.
He made his first team league début for Cherno More in a 1–2 home defeat against Lokomotiv Plovdiv on 26 May 2015.

On 1 February 2017, Nedelchev's contract with Cherno More was cancelled by mutual consent and he moved to Kaliakra Kavarna.

On 17 January 2018 he rejoined his youth club Spartak Varna.

Career statistics

References

External links

1996 births
Living people
Bulgarian footballers
Association football midfielders
PFC Spartak Varna players
PFC Cherno More Varna players
PFC Kaliakra Kavarna players
First Professional Football League (Bulgaria) players